The Bolivian spinetail or Inquisivi spinetail (Cranioleuca henricae) is a species of bird in the family Furnariidae, which was discovered in 1993 near Inquisivi, in the department of La Paz.

It is endemic to Bolivia. Its natural habitats are subtropical or tropical dry forest and plantations. It is threatened by habitat loss.

References

External links
Species factsheet - BirdLife International

Bolivian spinetail
Birds of the Bolivian Andes
Endemic birds of Bolivia
Bolivian spinetail
Taxonomy articles created by Polbot